Verloes Van Maldergem Marneffe syndrome, also known as microspherophakia-metaphyseal dysplasia is a very rare genetic disorder which is characterized by flattened and deformed vertebrae, developmental delay, dysplasia of the epiphyses and metaphyses, lens coloboma and dislocation, microspherophakia, nearsightedness, retinal detachment, and spinal stenosis.It has been described in a father and his son, and is thought to be inherited in an autosomal dominant manner. It's thought to be caused by mutations in the IRF6 gene.

References 

Genetic disorders by inheritance